Eresia clio, the common crescent or Clio crescent, is a butterfly of the family Nymphalidae. It was described by Carl Linnaeus in 1758. It is found from southern Mexico to Peru, Bolivia, the Guyanas and Brazil (from Amazonas to Mato Grosso). The habitat consists of forest edges with low vegetation.

The wingspan is about 36 mm. Adults feed on flower nectar and males have been observed sucking up moisture from damp places.

Subspecies
Eresia clio clio (Central America to Brazil)
Eresia clio reducta (Hall, 1929) (Ecuador)

References

Butterflies described in 1758
Melitaeini
Fauna of Brazil
Nymphalidae of South America
Taxa named by Carl Linnaeus